The Marshall Aid Commemoration Commission is a non-departmental public body of the British Foreign and Commonwealth Office that awards scholarships and fellowships to American students for postgraduate and postdoctoral study and research at UK universities.

History
The commission was established by the Marshall Aid Commemoration Act 1953 of the UK Parliament, in recognition of the Marshall Plan, which had provided economic support to Western Europe (including the UK) in the aftermath of the Second World War. The principal architect of the scheme was Sir Roger Makins (1904-1996), a Deputy Under Secretary in the Foreign Office. Soon after the bill was passed by parliament Makins was appointed British Ambassador to the United States. He was subsequently ennobled as Baron Sherfield.

The commission has up to ten members, who are appointed by the British Government. The first chairman was Sir Oliver Franks (1905-1992), who had been British Ambassador to the US while the Marshall Plan was in operation. The work of the commission is administered by the Association of Commonwealth Universities.

Twelve Marshall scholarships were awarded in the first year. The number of awards increased over the years with forty new awards made in 2017. Since 1954, approximately 1,800 Marshall Scholarships have been awarded.

Marshall Sherfield Fellowships were established in 1997 for postdoctoral research. The fellowships are named after Lord Sherfield, who as Sir Roger Makins was the architect of the commission.

Total expenditure in the year to March 2016 was £2,157,267, of which 93% was funded by the UK government. Some scholarships were jointly funded from other sources.

Marshall Scholarships

Marshall Scholarships are for postgraduate study by US students at UK universities. Candidates are nominated by US universities and are interviewed by eight regional committees in the US, based at the British Consulates-General and at the British Embassy in Washington DC.

The scholarships can cover courses of study from one or two years, extendable to three years. They pay university fees, a living allowance and travel from and to the US. Additional allowances are available for books and for research travel.

Marshall Sherfield Fellowships
Marshall Sherfield Fellowships support up to two American postdoctoral researchers to study at a UK university or research institute.

Marshall Medals
Marshall Medals are awarded every ten years by the commission, "to people of outstanding achievement whose contribution to British-American understanding, distinguished role in public life, or creative energy, reflect the legacy of George C Marshall."

Commissioners

 Christopher Fisher (Chair)
 Janet Legrand (Deputy Chair)
 Alan Bookbinder
 Professor Brian Cantor
 Suzanne McCarthy
 Professor Simon Newman
 Barbara Ridpath
 Xenia Wickett
 Lord Wood of Anfield

References

Further reading

External links

Foreign, Commonwealth and Development Office
Non-departmental public bodies of the United Kingdom government
1953 establishments in the United Kingdom
United Kingdom–United States relations